San Salvador River may refer to:

 San Salvador River (Chile)
 San Salvador River (Uruguay)